Matville is an unincorporated community in Pickaway County, in the U.S. state of Ohio.

History
A post office called Matville was established in 1889, and remained in operation until 1902. In 1906, Mativlle had about 50 inhabitants.

References

Unincorporated communities in Pickaway County, Ohio
Unincorporated communities in Ohio